Maidel Turner (May 12, 1888 – April 12, 1953) was an American movie actress featured in almost 60 films between 1913 and 1951, beginning as the leading lady of The Angel of the Slums (1913) and becoming a comical character actress as she aged. Prominent sound films in which she appeared include The Raven (1935), Palm Springs (1936), and State of the Union (1948).

Selected filmography

 The Boy Friend (1926) - Mrs. Wilson
 Olsen's Big Moment (1933) - Mrs. Van Allen (uncredited)
 The Barbarian (1933) - Flirty Dowager (uncredited)
 Another Language (1933) - Etta Hallam
 Beauty for Sale (1933) - Mrs. Gillespie, a Customer (uncredited)
 Only Yesterday (1933) - Party Guest (uncredited)
 The Worst Woman in Paris? (1933) - Mrs. Leda Jensen
 Fugitive Lovers (1934) - Little Boy's Mother (uncredited)
 It Happened One Night (1934) - last motel manager's wife (uncredited)
 Journal of a Crime (1934) - Stout Lady at Play Party (uncredited)
 A Modern Hero (1934) - Aunt Clara Weingartner
 A Very Honorable Guy (1934) - Mrs. Emerson (uncredited)
 Unknown Blonde (1934) - Mrs Parker
 Murder in Trinidad (1934) - Hysterical Woman (uncredited)
 The Merry Frinks (1934) - Mrs. Shinliver
 The Most Precious Thing in Life (1934) - Dean's Wife (uncredited)
 The Life of Vergie Winters (1934) - Ella Heenan
 Money Means Nothing (1934) - Mrs. Kerry Green
 Whom the Gods Destroy (1934) - Henrietta Crosland
 Million Dollar Ransom (1934) - Wife of Justice of the Peace (uncredited)
 Servants' Entrance (1934) - Dowager at Employment Agency (uncredited)
 She Had to Choose (1934) - Mrs. Cutler
 By Your Leave (1934) - Lady with Ancient Greek Costume (uncredited)
 Men of the Night (1934) - Mrs. Webbley
 Fugitive Lady (1934) - Mrs. Young (uncredited)
 Life Returns (1935) - Mrs. Vandergriff
 Sweepstake Annie (1935) - Friend of Mrs. Foster (uncredited)
 Night Life of the Gods (1935) - Burly Woman (uncredited)
 Mutiny Ahead (1935) - Kitty Vanderpool
 George White's 1935 Scandals (1935) - Audience Extra (uncredited)
 Society Fever (1935) - Mrs. Prouty
 The Raven (1935) - Harriet
 Dante's Inferno (1935) - Mme. Zucchini (uncredited)
 Atlantic Adventure (1935) - Mrs. Murdock (uncredited)
 Here Comes the Band (1935) - Chubby Lady (uncredited)
 Diamond Jim (1935) - Mrs. Perry (uncredited)
 The Gay Deception (1935) - Mrs. Dingledorf (uncredited)
 Dr. Socrates (1935) - Mary (uncredited)
 Bad Boy (1935) - Dowager with Ping Pong Racket (uncredited)
 Splendor (1935) - Mrs. Hicks (uncredited)
 Magnificent Obsession (1935) - Mrs. Martin (uncredited)
 The Bridge of Sighs (1936) - Mrs. Blaisdell
 Klondike Annie (1936) - Lydia Bowley (uncredited)
 Gentle Julia (1936) - Justice's Wife (uncredited)
 Show Boat (1936) - Mother (uncredited)
 Palm Springs (1936) - Mrs. Baxter (uncredited)
 And Sudden Death (1936) - Dodie Sloan
 Make Way for a Lady (1936) - Mrs. Jackson - Mildred's Mother (uncredited)
 She's Dangerous (1937) - Dowager (uncredited)
 Love Is News (1937) - Dowager Visiting Jail (uncredited)
 The Road Back (1937) - Member of Dinner Party (uncredited)
 Slim (1937) - Mrs. Johnson
 They Won't Forget (1937) - Stout Lady on Train (uncredited)
 Mr. Dodd Takes the Air (1937) - Lil Doremus (uncredited)
 Broadway Melody of 1938 (1937) - Boardinghouse Resident (uncredited)
 She Asked for It (1937) - Fat Woman (uncredited)
 State of the Union (1948) - Lulubelle Alexander
 Here Comes the Groom (1951) - Aunt Abby (final film role)

References

External links

1888 births
1953 deaths
American silent film actresses
Actresses from Texas
People from Sherman, Texas
20th-century American actresses